Burning Angel is the first EP by Swedish melodic death metal band Arch Enemy. It was released on 6 March 2002.  It is Arch Enemy's second release with vocalist Angela Gossow, who took Johan Liiva's place in the band. The song Starbreaker is a Judas Priest cover from the album Sin After Sin.

Track listing 

Note: The cover of "Starbreaker" was recorded in 1998, and therefore features former vocalist Johan Liiva.

Personnel

Arch Enemy 
Angela Gossow – vocals
Michael Amott – lead guitar
Christopher Amott – rhythm guitar
Sharlee D'Angelo – bass
Daniel Erlandsson – drums

Other personnel 
Johan Liiva – Vocals on "Starbreaker"
Niklas Sundin – Album cover

External links 
 Burning Angel at Encyclopaedia Metallum
Burning Angel at Metal Storm

Arch Enemy albums
2002 EPs
Century Media Records EPs